Arthur Henry Parnell (died 31 December 1935) was an Anglican priest.

Parnell was educated at Merton College, Oxford, and ordained in 1886. He was Vicar of Abbots Langley from 1893 to 1924; and Rector of Aspley Guise from then until 1928. He was Archdeacon of Bedford from 1924 to 1933, and Archdeacon of St Albans from 1933 until his death.

References

Alumni of Merton College, Oxford
Archdeacons of Bedford
Archdeacons of St Albans
1935 deaths
Year of birth missing
People from Three Rivers District